HMS Trident was an iron paddle sloop built for the Royal Navy by Ditchburn & Mare in 1845 at Leamouth, London.
 She served in the Mediterranean, off West Africa and in the South Atlantic, and was broken up in 1866.

Design and construction
Tridents design was commissioned on 2 August 1842 for a steam yacht to replace HMS Black Eagle (previously Firebrand). She was a third class iron paddle sloop, the only ship ever built to her design.  The builder's design was approved on 22 August 1843 and she was launched on 16 December 1845.  Her hull cost £17,000, and her machinery another £17,502. Fitting out was estimated to have cost a further £6,864.

Propulsion
She was originally intended to be fitted with a Maudslay side lever engine of 200 nominal horsepower, but received a Boulton, Watt & Co. two-cylinder oscillating steam engine with  diameter cylinders and  stroke.  The engine was rated at 350 nominal horsepower and propelled her at a maximum speed of  through a pair of paddle wheels.

Armament
Trident received a pair of 10-inch (85 cwt) guns and two (later four) 32-pounder gunnades.

Service
HMS Trident commissioned for the first time on 8 August 1846 for the Mediterranean. HMS Dwarf was severely damaged. Her crew were taken off by HMS Trident, which towed her in to Kinsale, County Cork. Between 1852 and 1861 she served on the South America Station and in the West Africa Squadron. On 11 December 1861 her commanding officer, Commander Beville Nicolas, was dismissed the service for cruelty after excessively punishing two boys for leave breaking at Gibraltar. She paid off at Woolwich on 20 December 1864.

Fate
Trident was broken up by Castle at Charlton in January 1866.

Notes

References

 

Paddle sloops of the Royal Navy
Ships built in Leamouth
Steam yachts
1845 ships
Trident